Stuart James Giddings (born 27 March 1986) is an English footballer.

Career
Born in Coventry, Giddings, a left-back, broke into the Coventry City first-team for his debut at the end of the 2003–04 season, when he came on as a late substitute in the final match of the season against Crystal Palace.

He represented England at all youth age groups up to under-19 level, but missed out on the 2005 Under 19 European Championships because of injury. He returned to action as a substitute during a 2–2 draw with Cardiff City in February 2007, but spent the rest of the campaign regaining his fitness ahead of a make-or-break 2007–08 season.

Giddings struggled once again with injury during the 2007–08 season. Once he regained fitness, he was sent out on loan to Oldham Athletic. New Coventry manager Chris Coleman announced that Giddings would be one of eight players whose contracts would not be renewed at the end of the season so he was released. In September 2008, Giddings joined Hinckley United debuting in the 4–1 FA Cup second qualifying round home victory over Solihull Moors on 27 September 2008.

On 10 November 2009, Giddings left Hinckley United to go on a week-long trial with Darlington, then bottom of the Football League. He earned a contract until the end of the season, and made 22 appearances, but was released early from his contract.

Having trialled with Kidderminster Harriers during the pre-season, Giddings joined Ilkeston Town for the 2010–2011 season.

After the demise of Ilkeston Town in September 2010, Giddings rejoined Hinckley United on 1 October 2010.

Giddings' career has been set back by a long-term knee injury.

Honours

As a player
Coventry City
Birmingham Senior Cup winner: 2006–07

References

External links
Stuart Giddings player profile at ccfc.co.uk

1986 births
Living people
Footballers from Coventry
English footballers
Association football fullbacks
Coventry City F.C. players
Oldham Athletic A.F.C. players
Hinckley United F.C. players
Darlington F.C. players
Ilkeston Town F.C. (1945) players
English Football League players
England youth international footballers